Pervomaysky is a rural locality (a khutor) in Logoskoye Rural Settlement, Kalachyovsky District, Volgograd Oblast, Russia. The population was 226 as of 2010. There are 9 streets.

Geography 
Pervomaysky is located 75 km southwest of Kalach-na-Donu (the district's administrative centre) by road. Logovsky is the nearest rural locality.

References 

Rural localities in Kalachyovsky District